Kessab, Kesab, or Kasab is a mostly Armenian-populated town in northwestern Syria, administratively part of the Latakia Governorate, located 59 kilometers north of Latakia. It is situated near the border with Turkey on the slope of Mount Aqraa, 800 meters above sea level. According to the Syria Central Bureau of Statistics, Kessab had a population of 1,754 in the 2004 census. Along with the surrounding villages, the sub-district of Kessab has a total population of around 2,500.

With its mild, moist climate and encirclement by wooded green mountains and deep valleys, Kessab is a favoured vacation resort for Syrians, mainly from Aleppo and Latakia.

Geography and climate

Administratively, Kessab belongs to the Latakia District; one of the governorate's four Manatiq, and the centre of Kessab nahiyah sub-district. The town has around 2,000 inhabitants, mainly Armenians. The name of the town is thought to be derived from the Latin Casa Bella (i.e. the beautiful house).

The town of Kessab is 59 kilometres north of Latakia, just 1 kilometre southwest of the border with Turkey (the former Syrian province of Alexandretta), and 7 kilometers east of the Mediterranean Sea.

Located at a height ranging between 650 and 850 above sea level, in the middle of dense coniferous Mediterranean forest, the town is a summer destination for Syrian people and for foreign visitors.

Kessab is an ancient Armenian settlement, dating back to the period of the Armenian Kingdom of Cilicia. Currently, the population is mainly Armenian with a minority of Arab Alawites. The town is surrounded with minor villages and farms with a majority of Armenians, including the villages of Duzaghaj (Nab' al-Murr), Esguran, Sev Aghpyur (al-Sakhra), Chinar (al-Dilbeh), Chakaljek, Keorkeuna, Ekizolukh (Nab'ain), Baghjaghaz (al-Mushrifeh), Karadouran (al-Samra), Karadash and the abandoned village of Bashord.

The town is surrounded with many mountains including the mountains of Bashord (857 meters), Dyunag (1008 meters), Dapasa (1006 meters), Chalma (995 meters) and Sildran (1105 metres) from the west, and mount al-Nisr (851 metres) from the south. Jebel Aqra -also known as Mount Casius- at the north, located in the Turkish side next to the borderline, is the highest peak of the Kessab region, with a height of 1709 meters.

History

Early history
The region of Kessab was part of the ancient civilization that spread from the Syrian coasts up to the Orontes River, six millennia ago. During the Seleucid period the Kessab region was at the centre of the triad comprised by Antioch, Seleucia and Laodicea. The Laodicea-Seleucia coastal road passed by the Karadouran bay whereas the Laodicea-Antioch road passed through the Duzaghaj valley. The Mount Casius at those times, was believed to have been the sanctuary of Zeus. During the reign of the ruler of the short-lived Armenian Empire Tigranes The Great, in the 1st century BC, and later the Roman era, the Syrian coast flourished greatly and had a positive effect on the development of the Kessab region.

There are no written sources about the primitive history of the Kessab region, but the first record of the name of Kessab was mentioned in a historical document dating back to the Crusaders period when Duke Belmont I granted the region of "Kasbisi" to the family of Peter the Hermit. Either Kasbisi, Cassembella or most probably the Latin expression Casa Bella are the names from which "Kessab" was derived.

Being located on the borders of the Armenian Kingdom of Cilicia, the region of Kessab was gradually developed by its Armenian migrants. A research published in 2009 by renowned linguist Hagop Cholakian on the peculiarities of the Kessab Armenian dialect and the dialects of the Armenians in the region of Alexandretta and Suweidiyeh, shows that the Armenians of Kessab and the surrounding villages are the remainders of migrants who came from the region of Antioch. The migration of the Armenians to the region increased in the 14th and the 15th centuries, during the Mamluk and the Ottoman periods, in an attempt to avoid persecutions, trying to find much safer mountainous regions such as Kessab and Musa Dagh. The first Armenian refugees settled in the area now called Esguran. After a period they moved uphill and settled in the area now called the town of Kessab, turning it to a centre of the whole region and the destination of new refugees.

During the 1850s Kessab turned into a mission field with the arrival of Evangelical and Catholic missionaries, raising anger among the Armenians of the region who were following the Armenian Apostolic Church. In the beginning of the 20th century, the population of Kessab region was around 6,000 (all Armenians), with more than 20 schools, as a result of denominational and political divisions.

20th century
The first disaster in Kessab took place in April 1909, during the Adana massacre. This calamity cost the Armenians 10,000 deaths and a massive material loss. After the event, Catholicos Sahak I Khabaian visited Kessab.

The Armenian genocide beginning in 1915 proved even more destructive. The command of the genocide initiation arrived in Kessab on the 26th of July to start deportations within 5 days. First, the people expressed a desire to resist and fortify on the mountain Dounag located in Karadouran. Priest Bedros Papoujian-Aprahamian, the priest of Karadouran, particularly supported the idea of the opposition, but on the real ground, the whole idea failed to become a reality. The genocide of the Armenians in Kessab region started from Karadouran. The Armenians were deported in two directions: one towards the desert of Deir ez-Zor and the other towards the south to the desert of Jordan. Almost five thousand Armenians were killed during this deportation process. Some died in Jisr al-Shughur, some in Hama or Homs while others on the way to Damascus or Jordan. The majority of the refugees were killed in the desert of Deir ez-Zor. After the ceasefire, the Armenians who survived the genocide returned to Kessab in a process that lasted till 1920. But the eastern and northern areas of the region remained unsecured, because they were constantly vulnerable to attacks from neighboring Turkish villages. A voluntary group of 40 men successfully foiled many attempts by bandits to invade the region at that time. In 1922, peace was established after the entrance of French troops into Kessab.

On 5 July 1938, the Turkish army entered the Sanjak of Alexandretta and Antioch, in an agreement with the French colonial authorities, and the region was renamed Hatay State. Many Armenians left Kessab for Lebanon or took refuge in the mountains. Many important personalities visited Kessab during that time. On 23 June 1939, the Hatay government was officially dissolved and the whole region became part of Turkey. By the efforts of the Armenian community of Paris, Cardinal Krikor Bedros Aghajanian and the Papal representative to Syria and Lebanon Remi Leprert, many parts of Kessab inhabited by Armenians were separated from Turkey and placed within the Syrian boundaries. The result of the annexation of the Sanjak of Alexandretta proved disastrous for the Armenians of Kessab: Mount Casius was attached to the Turkish side including their farms, properties, laurel tree forests and the grazing lands located in the mountain's bosoms and valleys that once used to belong to the native Armenians. Besides, with this annexation, the Armenians of the town were also deprived from their traditional and historical Barlum Monastery, where the inhabitants used to celebrate the feast of Surp Asdvadzadzin (feast of Virgin Mary) during August of each year.

Syrian Civil War

In the early hours of 21 March 2014, Kessab and its surrounding villages saw a multi-pronged attack by forces opposed to the Syrian government. It was reported that the attackers, members of the al-Nusra Front, Sham al-Islam, and Ansar al-Sham, advanced directly from Turkish territory, were being supported by the Turkish military, and that injured rebel fighters were being sent to medical centres in Turkey. Some Kessab village guards reported that the Turkish military withdrew from its positions along the border shortly before the fighters crossed from Turkey. Mehmet Ali Ediboğlu, MP of Turkish CHP party, who visited the area several days after the attack began, said that villagers on the Turkish side of the border told him that "thousands of fighters coming from Turkey crossed the border at at least five different points to launch the attack on Kassab". The fighters reportedly crossed into Syria from the village of Gözlekçiler, close to the border. Journalists were barred from visiting Gözlekçiler. Ediboğlu was also barred from approaching the border by Turkish soldiers but wrote of seeing "dozens of Syrian-plated cars nonstop transporting terrorists from the military road between Gözlekçiler village and our military base at Kayapinar." The civilian populations of Kessab and its surrounding villages either fled or were evacuated, with most seeking safety in Latakia, and Kessab came under the control of rebel groups. On 23 March, Turkish fighter jets shot down a Syrian fighter jet over Kessab that had been flying a support mission to assist Syrian army ground forces. The fighter crashed into Kessab. Turkey claimed that the jet had violated Turkish airspace, while Syria denied this. Turkish MP and CHP Party opposition leader Kemal Kılıçdaroğlu claimed that the Syrian jet was a reconnaissance plane and that its downing was part of a government scheme to provoke war with Syria to divert attention from corruption scandals enveloping Turkey's president Erdogan and his party. Journalist Amberin Zaman wrote that leaked tapes in which Turkish Foreign Minister, Ahmet Davutoğlu, is heard discussing ways to spark a war with Syria might vindicate Kilicdaroglu's claims.

On 2 April, during a hearing before the House State-Foreign Operations Appropriations Subcommittee and in response to a question by Congressman Schiff, US ambassador to the UN Samantha Power, said that Kessab "is an issue of huge concern". Congressman Schiff noted that many of the residents were descendants of victims of the Armenian Genocide and that "there is a particular poignancy to their being targeted in this manner." On 3 April Armenia's Minister of Diaspora Hranush Hakobyan said that 38 of Kessab's Armenian inhabitants had been captured when the town fell to the rebels, 24 of them were later released, 3 had been forcefully taken into Turkey and were now in the village of Vaqif, and that 670 Armenian families
had been displaced after the attack on Kessab, with about 400 of the families now in Latakia. The minister also said that in Kessab Armenian churches had been defaced, crosses on the churches had been removed, and property looted. Also on 3 April, Ruben Melkonyan, deputy dean of the Oriental Studies department at Yerevan State University, said that the Armenian community of Kessab was unlikely to recover and that what had happened were "crimes that make a genocide".

On 15 June 2014, the Syrian Army entered Kessab and retook control over the surrounding villages and the border with Turkey. News agencies and local residents of Kessab reported that the town's Armenian Catholic and Evangelical churches had been ruined and burnt by the Islamist groups, along with the Misakyan Cultural Centre. Around 250 families from Kessab who had taken refuge in Latakia returned to their homes a day after the Syrian Army recaptured the town. On July 25, the Holy Mother of God Church of Karadouran was reconsecrated, with the first liturgy since the ending of the Islamist occupation taking place on July 27, the day of Vardavar, an Armenian holiday, and attended by a large number of people.

Villages of Kessab

Duzaghaj / Nab' al-Murr
Duzaghaj or Nab' al-Murr, is located around 4 km south of Kessab townو, near the Syria-Turkey border checkpoint. The first Armenian settlers arrived in the area of Duzaghaj and founded the village during the mid 19th century when it was completely surrounded with forests. It was built on the road that was linking Latakia with Antioch. Within few years, the villagers in Duzaghaj have developed large farms attracting more settlers from the neighbouring villages. However, on 23 April 1909, the village was attacked and looted by the Turks. In 1915, the villagers were deported along with the dwellers of Keorkeuna village. Between 1919 and 1920, only few people were able to return to Duzaghaj. In 1939, after the new definition of the Syrian-Turkish border, the eastern part of Duzaghaj fell in the Turkish side. In 1947, the majority of the villagers migrated to Soviet Armenia. Currently, the major part of the original village of Duzaghaj is abandoned. The villagers built new houses along Aleppo-Kessab motor way. Nowadays, around 20 families with a majority of Armenians live in Duzaghaj.

Esguran / Nerki Kegh

Esguran or Nerki Kegh (meaning the lower village in Armenian), is located 2 km southeast of Kessab, only 700 meters west of the Syria-Turkey borderline. The nearby settlement of Khayit at the south, is also considered a part of Esguran village. In 1909, as a result of an attack by the Turks, the villagers of Esguran and Khayit escaped to the town of Kessab. However, the village was entirely destroyed and burnt by the Turks during the attack. In 1915, along with the Armenian population of the surrounding villages, the dwellers of Esguran and Khayit were deliberately deported towards the Syrian Desert. In 1920, only 50 people out of the original 200 villagers were able to return to the village. In 1939, after the new definition of the Syrian-Turkish border, the Armenians of Kessab lost the Barlum Monastery; their traditional site of pilgrimage, which fell on the Turkish side. Therefore, the Armenians of Kessab built a small chapel in Esguran to become the new site of the celebrations of the Assumption of Virgin Mary. The Sivdigi Greek Orthodox chapel, once stood on a small hill just on the Syrian–Turkish borderline, was destroyed by the Turks in the early 1980s. According to the census in 1955, Esguran and Khayit had only 68 inhabitants. Nowadays, 32 families live in the village with a majority of Armenians.

Sev Aghpyur / al-Sakhra
Sev Aghpyur (meaning the black fountain in Armenian) or al-Sakhra, is located less than 2 km northeast of the town of Kessab, only 200 meters away from the border with Turkey. It was originally formed as tobacco farms owned by the locals of Kessab. The hired farmers in the area, gradually became the owners of the lands and formed the majority of the population in Sev Aghpyur. However, the village was finally shaped and formed at the beginning of the 20th century. In 1909, the invading Turks coming from the nearby village of Ordu, burnt and destroyed a large part of the village. In 1915, 75% of the villagers were forced to leave their homes and killed during the death marches to the Deir ez-Zor Camps. In 1920, the village had only 94 individuals, declined from 445 as of the 1911 census. In 1939, after the new definition of the Syrian-Turkish border, major part of the tobacco farmlands of the village fell on the Turkish side. In 1947, when the Armenian repatriation process was launched, many of the villagers migrated to Soviet Armenia. During the 1950s, many Arab Alawite families moved to the village and took over the abandoned farms. Currently, the main occupation of the villagers in Sev Aghpyur is the production of apple. In 1990, the Aleppo-based Syriac Orthodox community established a convent in the village. Nowadays, the villages has 32 families, consisted equally of Armenians and Arab Alawites.

Chinar / al-Dilbeh
Chinar or al-Dilbeh, was originally formed at the southeastern foot of the Korom mountain, 3 km to the south of Kessab. There were two main quarters in Chinar before the Genocide: the quarter of the fountain, and the quarter of Katabians (named after the Katabian family). A deep valley of a length of 500 meters separated the two quarters. In 1909, the village was entirely destroyed by the Turks. In 1911, Chinar had population of 176 individuals, while in 1915, the number has grown up to 210. During the Genocide, almost two-thirds of the population of Chinar were killed. In 1920, around 77 survivors returned to the village and founded a new quarter at the right side of the valley. In 1947, the majority of the villagers migrated to Armenia. In 1965, Chinar had 40 Armenian families. Nowadays, the villages has around 50 families, with the two-thirds of them are Arab Alawites and the rest are Armenians.

Chakaljek
Chakaljek, is located less than 4 km south of Kessab and few hundred meters west of Chinar. The village is famous for its natural springs and gigantic trees. The Mateslek quarter at the west named after the Matosian family, is part of Chakaljek. In 1909, the village was burnt and looted by the Turks. In 1915, the people in Chakaljek were deported along with the people of Keorkeuna in two separate groups. In 1947, 29 individuals from Chakaljek migrated to Soviet Armenia. Within the last few decades, Chakaljek was transformed into a summer resort. A district of individual villas has been constructed at the backside of the original village. Nowadays, the villages has 17 families, consisted entirely of Armenians.

Keorkeuna

Keorkeuna, is located around 5 km south of Kessab, few hundred meters west of Chakhaljekh village and around 2 km east of Ekizolukh village. The scattered historical remains in the village, indicate that Keorkeuna has been inhabited since ancient times. The Armenian chapel of Surp Stepanos, stood on the southeastern hill of the village until the beginning of the 19th century. On 23 April 1909, the Turks attacked and destroyed the village of Keorkeuna. In 1915, more than one-thirds of the villagers were killed during the Genocide. In 1947, 63 individuals from Keorkeuna migrated to Soviet Armenia, particularly from the Chelebian family. 114 individuals remained in the village after the migration process. Nowadays, the number of the residents of Keorkeuna significantly grows during the summer, when native Armenians of Keorkeuna who live in different cities of Syria or Lebanon, return to their houses for holiday. Many Armenian families from Aleppo have built private villas in the village. Keorkeuna is considered a calm summer resort for the Armenians of Aleppo and Latakia. Currently, the villages has around 25 families, with the two-thirds of them are Armenians and the rest are Arab Alawites. The only active church in Keorkeuna belongs to the Evangelical Armenians.

Ekizolukh / Nab'ain

Ekizolukh or Nab'ain, was built at the beginning of the 19th century. It is located around 4 km west of Kessab. The population of the village were mainly involved in agriculture. During the Turkish attack in 1909, the villagers abandoned their houses and took refuge in the Latin monastery (nowadays belongs to the Armenian Catholics) in Baghjaghaz. In August 1915, the people of Ekizolukh were deliberately deported to the Syrian desert and the village lost more than two-thirds of its residents. Between 1919 and 1922, when there was no official authority ruling the region, Joe Toutigian organized a group of volunteered soldiers to provide security to Ekizolukh, the nearby "Valley of Honey" (Meghratsor) and the other surrounding villages, with the assistance of the volunteers from the town of Kessab. In 1947, the people in Ekizolukh did not welcome the migration process to Soviet Armenia, with only 20 individuals have moved to Armenia. The only active church in the village is the Armenian Evangelical Emmanuel Church, as the entire population of Ekizolukh turned from Apostolic to Evangelical in 1855. Since the mid 20th century, Armenians from Aleppo started to invest in Ekizolukh. Consequently, it became the first village to have water and electricity network and a paved road to link with the town of Kessab. Nowadays, the village has around 35 families, consisted entirely of Armenians.

Baghjaghaz / al-Mushrifeh
Baghjaghaz or al-Mushrifeh, is divided into 2 parts: upper Baghjaghaz and lower Baghjaghaz. Both of the parts are located on the way to the coastal village of Basit, at the southern slopes of the Sildran mountain. Upper Baghjaghaz is located around 12 km southwest of Kessab. The village was founded in the mid 19th century. In 1915, many villagers from upper Baghjaghaz were deported along with the residents of Ekizolukh. The census carried out in 1920, showed that 14 families were living in upper Baghjaghaz. In 1947, 81 individuals from the village migrated to Soviet Armenia. Lower Baghjaghaz is located 14 km southwest of Kessab, only 2 km away from upper Baghjaghaz. The village was founded at the beginning of the 20th century. Originally, the Armenian residents of the village were Turkish-speaking and very few of them could understand the Armenian dialect of Kessab. Thus, they were registered without the suffix "ian" attached to their surnames. The Latin Franciscan order established a monastery in the village and took the Armenian villagers under their supervision. They founded their monastery on a large landscape in the area of Kabachinar. In 1909, as a result of the Turkish attack, the Armenian refugees from the surrounding villages of Kessab region, found refuge in the monastery and latterly moved to the village of Basit, aided by the monks of the monastery. The villagers were able to return to their houses after few days of the attack. In August 1915, the villagers were deported towards Jisr al-Shughur, Aleppo and Hama. Three- quarters of the villagers were killed during the Genocide. The Latin monks continued to serve in the village until 1946 when they left Kessab and Baghjaghaz, and handed their properties over to the Armenian Catholic community. In 1947, the majority of the villagers of lower Baghjaghaz migrated to Soviet Armenia. Nowadays, the villages has around 55 families, with the two-thirds of them are Arab Alawites and the rest are Armenians.

Karadash
Karadash, is located 2 km west of Kessab at a height of 990 meters above sea level, on the way to the valley of Karadouran. Karadash remained abandoned until 1942, when the many residents from the nearby village of Karadouran moved to the area of current-day Karadash, escaping huge landslips. Starting from the 1990s, many more families from Kessab and Karadouran have moved to Karadash. At the beginning of the 21st century, Armenians from Aleppo have built many villas and compounds in the village transferring it into a summer resort.  Nowadays, the villages has 25 families, consisted entirely of Armenians.

Karadouran / al-Samra

Karadouran, also spelt Garaturan, or al-Samra, is located in a valley 4 km west of Kessab, starting from a height of 900 meters near the Dapasa mountain, all the way down towards the Mediterranean Sea. The village is an assembly of 9 small and large quarters spread all over the deep valley between the Bashord and Dyunag mountains. Each quarter is named after the family that occupied the quarter including the  Coastal quarter, Lndian (Lndonk), Kalemderian (Kelemderlek), Ghazarian (Ghezellek), Saghdejian (Saghdjlek), Titizian (Ttzlek), Soulian (Soullek), Yaralian (Yarallek), Zahterian (Zahterlek) and the largest one Manjikian (Manjeklek, Manjikounts). Karadouran was considered to be the most crowded village of Kessab. The census carried out after 1909, showed a population of 1,286 in the village. By the end of 1920, only 45% of the 1915 Genocide survivors were able to return to Karadouran. After the definition of the new Syrian-Turkish border in 1939, most villagers of Karadouran lost their farms and properties, which fell on the Turkish side. In the 1950s and 1960s, around 800 villagers from Karadouran left for Soviet Armenia during the repatriation process. The village frequently suffers from landslide, which forced many villagers to move to Kessab or to the nearby village of Karadash. Currently, 2 Armenian Apostolic and 1 Armenian Evangelical churches are functioning in the village. Nowadays, the villages has 45 families, consisted entirely of Armenians.

Bashord (abandoned village)
Bashord was located near the Syrian-Turkish borderline around 7 km west of Kessab, approximately 5 km westwards Karadash and 600 meters north of the valley of Karadouran. It was originally the main grazing area of the shepherds in the region of Kessab. The village was founded during the mid 19th century. As a result of the Turkish attack in 1909, the residents were forced to abandon the village which was completely looted by the Turks. During the Armenian Genocide, the residents of Bashord and Karadouran were driven towards the city of Hama in 1915. After the genocide, the population of the village counted only 45 inhabitants declined from 85 individuals as of the 1911 census. However, the definition of the new Syrian-Turkish border in 1939, allocated the properties of the Armenians to the Turks, a fact that made it impossible to preserve the flocks grazing in the area. In 1947, the entire population of the village -around 65 individuals- moved to Soviet Armenia within the frames of repatriation process. Nowadays, the half-ruined homes of the abandoned village could be seen in the area.

Culture

The population of Kessab and the surrounding villages are mainly involved in agriculture. The Armenians of the region have their own dialect of the Armenian language, which is still in use even among the new generation.
 
The number of Kessab visitors usually grows during summers especially in the month of August, when a lot of Armenians arrive in the mountainous town, to celebrate the feast of the Assumption of Mary. Many groups of Armenian scout movements visit Kessab to attend their summer camping programmes.

Starting from the 1990s, town had witnessed a construction booming with the inauguration of several hotels, houses and the renovation of the existing churches.

The town is known for its laurel soaps and apples.

Education
As of 2017, Kessab is home to the following schools: 
Ousumnasirats Miatsyal Armenian National High School, founded in 1933 as primary school. In 1962, the School of the Armenian Apostolic Church (founded earlier in 1848) was merged with the Ousumnasirats School. In 2002, Ousumnasirats Miatsyal was expanded and turned into a high school offering studies until 12th grade (Syrian state baccalaureate).
Nahadagats Miatsyal Armenian Evangelical School, operating since 1849, with many intervals, especially during the Genocide years.
Good Hope Armenian Catholic School, operating since 1864 with many intervals, especially during the Genocide years.
Public School of Kessab, is state-owned high school opened in 1960.

Demographics

Currently, Kessab nhayiah (sub-district) has a population of around 2,500, consisted of Armenians (80%) and Arab Alawites (20%).

The town of Kessab is home to 3 Armenian churches:
Holy Mother of God Armenian Apostolic Church; probably dating back to the period of the Armenian Kingdom of Cilicia, however, the exact year of its consecration is unknown. An inscription inside the church mentions that a major renovation took place in 1880.
Holy Trinity Armenian Evangelical Church, started in 1909 by Rev. Koundakjian, but left incomplete due to the mass deportations of 1915 during the Armenian Genocide. The completion was initiated and supervised in the mid 1960s, by then Rev. A. Kerbabian and completed in 1969. In the 1990s Rev. Serop Megerditchian undertook the renovation of the roof. The church was damaged during the attack of Jabhat al-Nusra militants in 2014. In July 2017, the church was reopened following a major renovation.
Saint Michael the Archangel Armenian Catholic Church, opened in 1925.

The town is also home to an Alawite mosque built in the early 1970s.

Churches in the nearby villages:
Surp Stepanos (Saint Stephen) Armenian Apostolic Church of Karadouran, built in 909. It is the oldest standing Armenian church in Syria. It was renovated in 1987 by the Armenian-French organization "Yergir yev Mshaguyt" (Country and Culture).
Holy Mother of God Armenian Apostolic Church of Karadouran: On 18 October 2009, Catholicos Aram I of the Holy See of Cilicia, consecrated the new Church of the Holy Mother of God in Karadouran. The newly built church replaced the old church originally built in 1890 and ruined in 1942, then rebuilt in 1950 and was about to crumble at the beginning of the 21st century.
Armenian Evangelical Church of Keorkeuna, opened in 1899.
Armenian Evangelical Church of Karadouran, opened in 1908 and renovated in 1986.
Emmanuel Armenian Evangelical Church of Ekizolukh, opened as a small chapel in 1911 and reconstructed in 1956.
Church and convent of Our Lady of Assumption of the Armenian Catholics in Baghjaghaz, opened in 1890 and renovated in 2003.
Our Lady of Joy Greek Catholic Monastic complex of Karadash.
Notre-Dame Greek Orthodox Church of Esguran: built between 1990 and 2002, to replace the old Greek chapel of the village, destroyed by the Turkish army in the early 1980s.

Notable people
 Moses Housepian (1876-1952), physician and relief worker
 Antranig Chalabian (1922–2011), US-based Armenian historian, medical illustrator and cartographer.
 Gabriel Injejikian (1930-2019), Armenian scholar and educator, the founder of the first Armenian day-school in North America.
 Karekin I Sarkissian (1932–1999), Catholicos of All Armenians between 1994 and 1999, and catholicos of the Great House of Cilicia between 1983 and 1994 as Karekin II.
 Reverend Dr. Vahan Tootikian (b. 1935), US-based Armenian historian and the Executive Director of the Armenian Evangelical World Council.
 Garbis Kortian (1938-2009), philosopher
 Hagop Cholakian (b. 1947), Doctor of Philosophy in History, renowned Armenian writer, linguist, novelist and teacher, head of the section of Western Armenian language in the Armenian Institute of Language.

Gallery

See also 
 Armenians in Syria
 List of Armenian ethnic enclaves

References

Further reading
 Ալպոմ Քեսապի եւ շրջակայից [Album of Kesap and Its Environs] Beirut, 1955. 
 Cholakian, Hakob. Քեսապ [Kesap], 3 vols. Aleppo: Hamazgayini Surioy Shrj. Varchutean, 1995-2004.
McDonnell, Patrick J. "Ethnic Armenians tell of flight from Kasab, their town in Syria." Los Angeles Times. April 9, 2014.

External links
 Kessab Armenians website (English & Armenian)

 Кесаб и армяне — кесабцы 

Armenian communities in Syria
Populated places in Latakia District
Towns in Syria